The Mixed 10 metre air rifle standing SH2 event at the 2012 Summer Paralympics took place on 2 September at the Royal Artillery Barracks in Woolwich.

The event consisted of two rounds: a qualifier and a final. In the qualifier, each shooter fired 60 shots with an air rifle at 10 metres distance from the "standing" (interpreted to include seated in wheelchairs) position, using a spring-mounted stand to replicate the movement of the front hand. Scores for each shot were in increments of 1, with a maximum score of 10.

The top 8 shooters in the qualifying round moved on to the final round. There, they fired an additional 10 shots. These shots scored in increments of .1, with a maximum score of 10.9. The total score from all 70 shots were used to determine the final ranking.

Qualification round

Q = Qualified for final. EWR = Equal World Record.

Final
All the qualifiers were male.

FPR = Final Paralympic record.

References

Shooting at the 2012 Summer Paralympics